Nikolay Vladimirovich Fomenko (born  30 April 1962) is a Russian musician, comic actor, professional motor racer, former president of Marussia Motors and former engineering director of Marussia F1.

Music career 
Fomenko started his career as vocalist and guitarist in the band Secret, who were very popular in Russia in the mid-1980s.

Acting career 
Fomenko first started his acting career as a theater actor in the Theater of Youth Creativity (1974-1976).

Filmography 
{| class="wikitable"
!Year!!Film!!Role
|-
|1983
|Speed (Skorost''')
|Student
|-
|1997
|Sympathy Seeker (Sirota Kazanskaya)
|Kolya
|-
|1999
|Luna Papa (Lunny Papa)
|Yassir
|-
|1999
|The Sky with Diamonds (Nebo v Almazakh)
|Anton Chekhov
|-
|2000
|Check (Chek)
|Brunet
|-
|2000
|Old Hags (Starye Klyachi)
|businessman Vassily Khomenko
|-
|2003
|The Suit (Shik)
|Botya
|-
|2003
|Bedroom Key (Klyuch ot Spal'ni)
|Vakhlakov
|-
|2007
|Model (Naturshchitsa)
|
|-
|2007
|Gloss (Глянец)
|
|-
|2008
|Radio Day (Den' Radio)
|As himself
|-
|2017
|You All Infuriate Me|Boris Dmitrievich
|-
|2017
|Rock Dog|Angus Scattergood
|}

 TV career 
Fomenko performed in the popular Russian music collection series Staryye Pesni o Glavnom (Old songs about the important).

He hosted two seasons of a TV show The Interception and a season of the game-show The Weakest Link on Russia's Channel 5.

In 2009, he began hosting Top Gear Russia'', the REN-TV spin-off of the BBC series Top Gear.

Car racing career 
In 1994, Fomenko was invited by Vladislav Listyev to participate in a car racing show as a celebrity guest. Later he started to train as a professional racer and took his first victory in 1996.

FIA GT

Endurance races

Car manufacturer 
Fomenko is involved in the development and launching of the Marussia sports car.

Formula One 
In 2010 Marussia became a sponsor of Virgin Racing Formula One team. On 11 November 2010, Marussia acquired a controlling stake in the team.

On 2 February 2011 Fomenko was announced as Engineering Director of the Marussia Virgin Racing Formula One team.

Personal life 
He was married to Andrei Mironov's stepdaughter, actress Maria Golubkina, and has three children: daughters Anastasia and Ekaterina, and a son, Ivan.

References

External links 
 Official site

 Nikolai Fomenko at http://www.fiagt.com

1962 births
Living people
Russian people of Ukrainian descent
24 Hours of Le Mans drivers
FIA GT Championship drivers
European Le Mans Series drivers
Russian male film actors
Russian male television actors
Soviet male singers
Honored Artists of the Russian Federation
20th-century Russian male actors
21st-century Russian male actors
Russian pop singers
Russian racing drivers
Russian rock singers
Russian bass guitarists
Male bass guitarists
Russian composers
Russian male composers
Russian television personalities
Musicians from Saint Petersburg
24 Hours of Spa drivers
Formula One team owners
Male actors from Saint Petersburg
Sportspeople from Saint Petersburg